Alexander Laban Hinton is an anthropologist whose work focuses on genocide, mass violence, extremism, transitional justice, and human rights. He has written extensively on the Cambodian genocide and, in 2016, was an expert witness at the Khmer Rouge Tribunal. He has authored many books including, most recently, It Can Happen Here: White Power and the Rising Threat of Genocide in the US and Anthropological Witness: Lessons from the Khmer Rouge Tribunal. , he is a distinguished professor at Rutgers University.

Research 
Alexander Hinton is the author of seventeen books and numerous essays. He serves as an Academic Advisor to the Documentation Center of Cambodia, on the International Advisory Boards of journals such as the Genocide Studies and Prevention, Journal of Genocide Research, and Journal of Perpetrator Research, and as co-editor of the CGHR-Rutgers University Press book series, "Genocide, Political Violence, Human Rights." He also co-organized the 2014-2016 Rethinking Peace Studies initiative and is co-convener of the Global Consortium on Bigotry and Hate (2019-2024). Hinton's next book, "Anthropological Witness," centers on his 2016 experience testifying as an expert witness at the Khmer Rouge tribunal in Cambodia.

Research positions 
, Hinton holds the positions of Director of the Center for the Study of Genocide and Human Rights, Distinguished Professor of Anthropology, and UNESCO Chair in Genocide Prevention at Rutgers University. During 2011–2013, Hinton was President of the International Association of Genocide Scholars. He was a Member/Visitor at the Institute for Advanced Study in Princeton, New Jersey during the same period.

Awards and Prizes 
Among other awards, Hinton received the American Anthropological Association's 2009 Robert B. Textor and Family Prize for Excellence in Anticipatory Anthropology and 2022 Anthropology in the Media Award.

Scholarly works 
Notable publications by Hinton include:
 Biocultural Approaches to the Emotions (Cambridge University Press, 1999) 
 Genocide: An Anthropological Reader (Blackwell, 2002) 
 Annihilating Difference: The Anthropology of Genocide (California, 2002) 
 Why Did They Kill? Cambodia in the Shadow of Genocide (California, 2005) [Awarded 2008 Stirling Prize] 
 Night of the Khmer Rouge (Paul Robeson Gallery, 2007)
 Genocide: Truth, Memory, Representation (Co-edited, Duke, 2009)
 Transitional Justice: Global Mechanisms and Local Realities after Genocide and Mass Violence (Rutgers, 2010) 
 Hidden Genocides: Power, Knowledge, Memory (Co-edited, Rutgers, 2014) 
 Colonial Genocide in Indigenous North America (co-edited, Duke, 2014) 
 Genocide and Mass Violence (co-edited, Cambridge, 2015) 
 Man or Monster? The Trial of a Khmer Rouge Torturer (Duke, 2016) 
 The Justice Facade: Trials of Transition in Cambodia (Oxford, 2018) 
 Rethinking Peace: Discourse, Memory, Translation, and Dialogue (co-edited, Rowman and Littlefield, 2019) 
 It Can Happen Here: White Power and the Rising Threat of Genocide in the US (NYU, 2021) 
 Anthropological Witness: Lessons from the Khmer Rouge Tribunal (Cornell, 2022) 
 Perpetrators: Encountering Humanity's Dark Side (co-authored, Stanford, 2023)

References

External links 
 

Year of birth missing (living people)
Living people
Rutgers University faculty
Genocide studies scholars
American anthropologists